Acanthodactylus tristrami, commonly called the Lebanon fringe-fingered lizard and Tristram's spiny-footed lizard, is a species of lizard in the family Lacertidae. The species is endemic to the Middle East.

Etymology
The specific name, tristrami, is in honor of Canon Henry Baker Tristram, who was an English naturalist and Anglican priest.

Geographic range
A. tristrami is found in Iraq, Jordan, Lebanon, and Syria

Habitat
The preferred habitat of A. tristrami is shrubland.

Reproduction
A. tristrami is oviparous.

References

Further reading
Boulenger GA (1881). "On the Lizards of the Genera Lacerta and Acanthodactylus ". Proceedings of the Zoological Society of London 1881: 739–747 + Plates LXIII-LXIV. (Acanthodactylus tristrami, new combination, p. 741 + Plate LXIII, figures 1a-1d).
Boulenger GA (1887). Catalogue of the Lizards in the British Museum (Natural History). Second Editionn. Volume III. Lacertidæ ...London: Trustees of the British Museum (Natural History). (Taylor and Francis, printers). xii + 575 pp. + Plates I-XL. (Acanthodactylus tristrami, pp. 68–69).
Günther A (1864). "Report on a Collection of Reptiles and Fishes from Palestine". Proc. Zool. Soc. London 1864: 488–493. (Zootoca tristrami, new species, p. 491).
Disi, Ahmad M.; Modrý, David; Nečas, Petr; Rifai, Lina (2001). Amphibians and Reptiles of the Hashemite Kingdom of Jordan. Frankfurt am Main, Germany: Chimaira. 408 pp. . 
Salvador, Alfredo (1982). "A revision of the lizards of the genus Acanthodactylus (Sauria: Lacertidae)". Bonner Zoologische Monographien (16): 1–167. (Acanthodactylus tristrami, pp. 101–106, Figures 57–59, Map 20b). (in English, with an abstract in German).
Sindaco, Roberto; Jeremčenko, Valery K. (2008). The Reptiles of the Western Palearctic: 1. Annotated Checklist and Distributional Atlas of the Turtles, Crocodiles, Amphisbaenians and Lizards of Europe, North Africa, Middle East and Central Asia. (Monographs of the Societas Herpetologica Italica). Latina, Italy: Edizioni Belvedere. 580 pp. .

Acanthodactylus
Lizards of Asia
Reptiles of Iraq
Reptiles of Jordan
Reptiles of Syria
Reptiles described in 1864
Taxa named by Albert Günther